Tyler Freeman may refer to:

 Tyler Freeman (soccer) (born 2003), American soccer player
 Tyler Freeman (baseball) (born 1999), American baseball player